Castaño del Robledo is a town and municipality located in the province of Huelva, Spain. According to the 2005 census, it has a population of 205 inhabitants and covers a  area (15.8 people/km²).

References

External links
Castaño del Robledo - Sistema de Información Multiterritorial de Andalucía

Municipalities in the Province of Huelva